Pratima Kannan (mostly known by her maiden name Pratima Kazmi; born 21 July 1948) is an Indian television actress who has worked in many Bollywood movies and Hindi television drama series. She started her career in 1997 with an English film called Sixth Happiness

Filmography

Television
Itihaas as Khabri
X Zone (1998)
Saat Phere as Kalika's aunt  
Uttaran as Sumitra Devi / Nani (2008–2015)
Jabb Love Hua as Raghu's grandmother (2006–2007)
Kammal as Rama 
Kya Haadsa Kya Haqeeqat as Bharini in Kaboo
Kesar as  Abhi's mother 
Mann Kee Awaaz Pratigya as Guruma
Mere Angne Mein as Bua Dadi
Ishq Ka Rang Safed as Indrani (2015–2016)
Siya Ke Ram as Kaikesi
Humko Tumse Ho Gaya Hai Pyaar Kya Karein as Dharamveer's elder sister (2016)
Kaala Teeka as Maai (2017)
Udaan as Rajeshwari Devi (2018)
 Bitti Business Wali (2018)
 Phir Laut Aayi Naagin as Anand's elder sister Mohini (2019)
Bhabiji Ghar Par Hain! as Helen Mishra Vibhuti's mother (2020)
Nath Zewar Ka Zanjeer (2021-present)

Films

Dabangg 3 (2019)
Humne Gandhi Ko Maar Diya (2018)
Badlapur (film) (2015)
Bhopal Mail (2010)
Under Trial
Ishq Ho Gaya Mamu (2008)
Buddha Mar Gaya (2007)
Undertrial (2007)
No Entry (2005)
Film Star (2005)
Ssukh (2005)
Bunty Aur Babli (2005)
Elephant Boy (2005)
Mumbai Xpress (2005)
Sehar (2005)
Black Friday (2004)
Jaago (2004)
Ek Hasina Thi (2004)
  
Waisa Bhi Hota Hai Part II (2003)
Market (2003)
Yeh Dil (2003)
Pinjar (2003)
Raaz (2002)
Gadar: Ek Prem Katha (2001)
Dil Pe Mat Le Yaar!! (2000)
Fiza (2000)
Shool (1999)
Godmother (1999)
Such a Long Journey (1998)
Dushman (1998)
Sixth Happiness (1997)
Vardi (film) (1989) dancer in the song "Maine Kitne Dil Liye" wearing blue

References

External links
 
 
Official Site on BollywoodHungama.com

Living people
Indian soap opera actresses
21st-century Indian actresses
1948 births
Actors from Mumbai